Doomwatch is a British science fiction television programme produced by the BBC, which ran on BBC1 between 1970 and 1972. The series was set in the then present day, and dealt with a scientific government agency led by Doctor Spencer Quist (played by John Paul), responsible for investigating and combating various ecological and technological dangers.

The series was followed by a film adaptation produced by Tigon British Film Productions and released in 1972, and a revival TV film was broadcast on Channel 5 in 1999.

Background
The programme was created by Gerry Davis and Kit Pedler, who had previously collaborated on scripts for Doctor Who, a programme on which, for a time during the late 1960s, Davis had been the story editor and Pedler the unofficial scientific adviser. Their interest in the problems of science changing and endangering human life had led them to create the popular cyborg villains the Cybermen for that program. Similar interests led them to create Doomwatch, which explored new and unusual threats to the human race, many bred out of the fear of real scientific concepts, with a "this could happen to us" angle.

The series
The formal name of the protagonist's organization was "Department for the Observation and Measurement of Scientific Work". Officially Doomwatch was an agency dedicated to preserving the world from dangers of unprincipled scientific research. In the words of one character, "We were set up to investigate any scientific research, Public or Private, which could possibly be harmful to Man." Its actual intended purpose was to form a body with little power meant in order to stifle public protest and secure green votes. However, the incorruptible Spencer Quist and his allies soon gave the agency some actual power and influence.

Quist had worked on the development of the atomic bomb and seen his wife die of radiation poisoning; Ridge was the secret agent type and Wren a conscientious researcher. Together they took science into people's living rooms, explaining about embryo research, subliminal messages, wonder drugs, dumping of toxic waste, noise pollution, nuclear weaponry, animal exploitation, etc.

Storylines included a genetic mutation that created a particularly large and vicious race of rats, and a virus that ate away at all types of plastics causing aeroplanes to fall out of the sky. There were also less dramatic stories such as an episode that centred around the medical dangers of jet lag. After Davis and Pedler left the series at the conclusion of the second series in 1971, the series turned into a more conventional thriller drama. The two creators openly criticised this change.

The first two series each consisted of thirteen episodes, and the third of twelve, of which one, titled "Sex and Violence", was not transmitted. It has been suggested that this was because of objections to either its use of stock news footage of a public execution in Lagos, or its presentation of characters designed to be satirical analogues of Mary Whitehouse, Cliff Richard and Lord Longford. The execution footage has appeared on British television a number of times since 1972, notably in a 1988 edition of Panorama about violence on television.

Doomwatch was popular, and at its peak drew audiences of as high as 13.6 million for the episode "Invasion", filmed mostly in the village of Grassington in North Yorkshire. The start of every series merited a cover feature on the BBC's Radio Times listings magazine, which even today is a prestigious feat for a programme. The series was also sold abroad, gaining some popularity when transmitted in Canada.

Archive loss after production
As was common at the time, the BBC wiped the Doomwatch master tapes soon after transmission, regarding them as being of little further use. Although some episodes have been returned from Canada or exist as telerecordings, many are still missing and will probably remain so, although all are being sought by the BBC Archive Treasure Hunt as a whole. However, a copy of the un-broadcast episode survives in the archives, one of only three from the final series to do so. Series two is complete, thanks to the returns from Canada, but series one is missing five episodes. All of the existing episodes, other than "Sex and Violence", were repeated on the satellite channel UK Gold during the 1990s, although that episode was erroneously published in broadcast schedules.

Cast and crew
The main character throughout the series was Nobel Prize winner, Dr Spencer Quist, who had been given the task of setting up and running the department by the British government. Quist is haunted by guilt through having worked on the Manhattan Project, making the first nuclear bomb. He was played throughout the BBC run by John Paul, a familiar face from a range of British television series, who later went on to appear in I, Claudius.

The other main regular character throughout the run was Dr John Ridge, played by Simon Oates. He often did not see eye to eye with Quist, whom he called a "bastard" in episode 7 for manipulating one of his own staff into lying to Ridge on the telephone that their secretary, Pat Hunnisett, had died. Dr Ridge appeared in only four episodes of the final season. One of the first series' main characters was Tobias 'Toby' Wren (Robert Powell), who provided one of Doomwatchs most memorable episodes when he was dramatically killed off in an explosion at the conclusion of the series one finale, "Survival Code". Powell had only signed for one series; the producers wanted him to sign for a second run, but he was adamant that he wanted to leave the series on a high, and suggested that they get rid of him by blowing him up, which they did. The BBC got more letters on his unexpected death in the series than any other subject since the Second World War.

Wren was trying to disarm a nuclear device, which had been traced to a pavilion at the end of a seaside pier at Byfield Regis. Having thought he was finished, a pair of wire cutters slips from Wren's hands and falls into the sea just before he discovers a last wire as the remaining seconds tick away. Though the nuclear part of the bomb is safe, we see the pavilion explode as the conventional explosive goes off, killing Wren and two others. Though this episode is missing, the scene is shown at the start of the first episode of series two in which there are recriminations, guilt and an official enquiry, which is intended to get rid of Quist.

Wren was played by Robert Powell, who later found worldwide fame as the title character in the television series Jesus of Nazareth, and starred in films such as the 1978 version of The Thirty-Nine Steps and later the BBC medical series Holby City in the 2000s and 2010s. The ministerial antagonist to the Doomwatch team, determined to keep the department following the government line, was played by John Barron, better known as 'CJ' from the comedy series The Fall and Rise of Reginald Perrin. Other members of the cast were: Philip Bond as Inspector Drew, Joby Blanshard as Colin Bradley, Wendy Hall as Pat Hunnisett, Vivien Sherrard as Barbara Mason, John Nolan as Geoff Hardcastle, John Bown as Commander Neil Stafford, Jean Trend as Dr. Fay Chantry, Elizabeth Weaver as Dr Anne Tarrant, and Moultrie Kelsall as Drummond.

Throughout its run, Doomwatch was produced by Terence Dudley, who also contributed several scripts himself. Dudley went on to produce another well-remembered BBC science-fiction drama, Survivors, and in the early 1980s wrote and directed episodes of Doctor Who. Aside from Davis, Pedler and Dudley, several other writers wrote episodes for the programme, including well-known veterans of several other British television science-fiction productions such as Robert Holmes, Dennis Spooner and Louis Marks.

Spin-off film
The Doomwatch feature film was produced by Tigon British Film Productions Ltd under licence from the BBC, and released in 1972. The script was based on a screenplay by Clive Exton from a story by Davis and Pedler. The television series' main characters appeared, played by their original actors, but main billing was given Ian Bannen and Judy Geeson as new characters. The film also featured George Sanders.

Revival
In 1999, Channel 5 bought the rights to revive Doomwatch from the BBC, and on 7 December that year screened a 100-minute TV movie produced by the independent production company Working Title Television. Subtitled Winter Angel, the television movie was a continuation of the story rather than a remake.

Written by John Howlett and Ian McDonald, only one of the original characters from the series appears, an aged Dr Spencer Quist—now played by actor Philip Stone, as John Paul had died in 1995. Quist is killed off during the course of the TV movie, and the main character was Neil Tannahill, played by Trevor Eve, who at the conclusion of the story sets up a new Doomwatch group to pursue the same aims as that of the original series. In the film, an artificial black hole is created as an energy source. The downside of this was, once created, it must be forever looked after or it could explode with force enough to destroy a country.

Although Channel 5 had intended the production to act as the pilot for a possible series and it had been generally well received by critics and public, further episodes were not forthcoming. This was generally accepted to be for reasons of cost.

VHS and DVD releases
BBC Enterprises released two separate VHS tapes in March 1991, the first containing "The Plastic Eaters" and "Tomorrow, the Rat", and the second "The Red Sky" and "You Killed Toby Wren". Paradox Films re-issued the tape of "The Plastic Eaters"/"Tomorrow, the Rat" in June 1995, with a different cover, and subsequently released the same episodes on DVD in January 2001.

In April 2016, Simply Media released a seven-disc DVD box set containing all 24 surviving episodes of Doomwatch, including "Sex and Violence", which remains unbroadcast. The DVD box set also contains the BBC documentary The Cult of Doomwatch, originally broadcast on BBC Four on 21 November 2006.

Books
Pedler and Davis reused the plot of the first episode of the series, "The Plastic Eaters", for their 1971 novel Mutant 59: The Plastic Eater, This was not technically a Doomwatch novel, however, and did not contain the characters from the series. The book also re-used the Radio Times cover photograph of a melted plastic aeroplane in a briefcase.

In 1975, Longman Education published Doomwatch - The World in Danger, a simplified adaptation of the episodes "The Plastic Eaters", "The Red Sky" and "Survival Code".

In 2012, Miwk Publishing released Deadly Dangerous Tomorrow, a collection of scripts of six of the missing episodes: "Spectre at the Feast", "Fire and Brimstone", "High Mountain", "Say Knife, Fat Man", "Deadly Dangerous Tomorrow" and "Flood".

Episodes
There are 38 episodes of Doomwatch that were recorded, 37 of which were broadcast on BBC1 on Monday nights from February 1970 to August 1972. 14 episodes of Doomwatch are currently missing from the television archives, mainly from series three. 23 of the transmitted episodes of Doomwatch are known to survive; the untransmitted "Sex and Violence" also survives and has still never been broadcast on British television, although it is included on the 2016 DVD box set release.

Series One

Series Two

Series Three

References

Sources
Radio Times, 1970–1972.

External links

 
Episode guides
Episodes ranked "Worst to Best" at the Anorak Zone

BBC television dramas
Lost BBC episodes
BBC science fiction television shows
British horror fiction television series
1970s British science fiction television series
1970 British television series debuts
1972 British television series endings
English-language television shows